JMI is the Java Metadata Interface.

JMI may also refer to:
Jahangirabad Media Institute, a media institute in India
James Madison Institute, a free-market American think tank headquartered in Tallahassee, Florida, United States
Jamia Millia Islamia, a central university located in New Delhi, India
 Jennings Musical Instruments, an electronic instrument company
 , a youth music NGO
 Jewish Music Institute, an arts organisation based at the University of London's School of Oriental and African Studies
Jimi language (Nigeria)'s ISO 639 code
Jordan Media Institute, a non-profit educational entity focusing on journalism
JMI – Journal of Music in Ireland
 Just Marketing International, a motorsports marketing services company